Cadenazzo railway station is a railway station in the municipality of Cadenazzo, in the Swiss canton of Ticino. It is located at the junction of the standard gauge Cadenazzo–Luino and Giubiasco–Locarno lines of Swiss Federal Railways.

Services 
 the following services stop at Cadenazzo:

References

External links
 
 

Railway stations in Switzerland opened in 1874
Railway stations in Ticino
Swiss Federal Railways stations